The Seymchan is a river in Srednekansky District, Magadan Oblast, Russia.

The name comes from the Yakut language word Kheymchen, which is an area of open water surrounded by sea ice.

Course
The river rises in the Upper Kolyma Highlands, eastern limits of the Chersky Range, at the confluence of Left Seymchan and Right Seymchan. It flows first in a northeast direction, bending along its course until it flows in a southeastern direction. Finally it meets the Kolyma near Seymchan,  from its mouth, downstream from the mouth of the Buyunda on the opposite bank.

Together with the Buyunda that flows roughly northwards on the other side of the Kolyma basin, the Seymchan forms the Seymchan-Buyunda Depression, which limits the Upper Kolyma Highlands from the east.

Its main tributaries are the Medvezhya and the Verina.

See also
List of rivers of Russia

References

External links
NAVIGATION TO ANUYSK VIA SEYMCHAN
Rivers of Magadan Oblast